is a Japanese politician of the Democratic Party of Japan, a member of the House of Councillors in the Diet (national legislature). A graduate of Hosei University, he worked at the government of Miyazaki Prefecture from April 1991 to December 1996 and then served in its assembly from 1999 to 2003. In 2004, he was elected to the House of Councillors for the first time.

Right-wing positions
He was a supporter of right-wing filmmaker Satoru Mizushima's 2007 revisionist film The Truth about Nanjing, which denied that the Nanking Massacre ever occurred.

References

External links 
  in Japanese.

Members of the House of Councillors (Japan)
1966 births
Living people
Democratic Party of Japan politicians
Nanjing Massacre deniers
Hosei University alumni